A list of films produced in Spain in 1987 (see 1987 in film).

1987

External links
 Spanish films of 1987 at the Internet Movie Database

1987
Lists of 1987 films by country or language
Films